Bonita Creek is a stream in the city of Newport Beach, Orange County, California.

Gallery

See also
 List of rivers of Orange County, California

External links

Rivers of Orange County, California
Orange County, California articles needing infoboxes
Unreferenced Orange County, California articles